Yuchujian was a chanyu of the Xiongnu Empire. He succeeded his brother the Northern Chanyu upon his defeat in 91 AD by the Han dynasty. Yuchujian settled at Yiwu near modern Hami and surrendered to the Han dynasty. In 93 AD, Yuchujian rebelled and fled to the north. He was convinced to return by Ren Shang and Wang Fu but died on the way back.

Footnotes

References

Bichurin N.Ya., "Collection of information on peoples in Central Asia in ancient times", vol. 1, Sankt Petersburg, 1851, reprint Moscow-Leningrad, 1950

Taskin B.S., "Materials on Sünnu history", Science, Moscow, 1968, p. 31 (In Russian)

Chanyus
1st-century monarchs in Asia